The 1941 edition of the Campeonato Carioca kicked off on May 4, 1941 and ended on November 23, 1941. It was organized by FMF (Federação Metropolitana de Futebol, or Metropolitan Football Federation). Ten teams participated. Fluminense won the title for the 14th time. no teams were relegated.

System
The tournament would be divided in two stages:
 First phase: The ten teams all played against each other in a double round-robin format. The six best teams qualified to the Second phase.
 Second phase: The remaining six teams all played in a double round-robin format against each other. The team with the most points in the sum of both stages won the title.

Championship

First phase

Second phase

Final standings

Extra Tournament

Top Scores

References

Campeonato Carioca seasons
Carioca